Ray Romeo Antonio is an American filmmaker, musician, and author.

Career

Early career
Romeo Antonio's early music career started in Sydney, Australia. His debut album, The Real Romeo, was released in 1992 on A&M Records, with Antonio playing all instruments on the album. A Piece of Love Society was released in 1996 on Festival Records/BMG.

RomenMpire Records 
Steve Lobel introduced Antonio to Darryl McDaniels, one of the founding members of Run-DMC, which led to Antonio producing McDaniels' solo album, Checks Thugs and Rock n Roll, which was released on Romeo Antonio's RomenMpire Records on 28 March 2006.

As a film-maker 

In 2006, Antonio executive produced the Emmy-award-winning VH1 documentary, DMC: My Adoption Journey, following Darryl McDaniels search for information about his early life and his birth parents. The Emmy Award was shared by Antonio, McDaniels, Sarah McLachlan, Shawn Papazian, and Michael DeLorenzo. It aired on CBS Sunday Morning.

In 2007 Antonio produced the TV pilot The Man written by Anthony Zuiker and directed by Simon West, starring LL Cool J.

In 2010 Antonio directed and co-wrote "Rollers" which won best drama at NYIFF. Antonio also produced "Pizza with Bullets" which won 7 film festival awards. Antonio also produced "Just Peck" starring Keir Gilchrist, Marcia Cross, Adam Arkin, and Brie Larson who went on to win the Academy Award for best actress in "Room".

Antonio also produced the 2007 short film Lucifer. In 2008, he was the Executive Producer of Trophy, a TV drama distributed by Home Box Office and Peccadillo Pictures.

In 2015 it was reported that Antonio had reached an agreement with the family of Sam Cooke to make a biopic of the soul singer.

Antonio also directed and produced a pilot for NashVegas, a scripted reality show following five people in different stages of their music industry careers, combined with a public-vote songwriting competition.

Discography

Albums
1997: Romeo's Gys/ Still Waters [Explicit]
 2000: Swear Not By The Mood
 2001: Romeo's 245/ Aggravated Assault Explicit
 2010: Romeo's Backroom Story
 2012 Romeo's Unique [Explicit]

Appearances on albums by other artists

References

External links
 

1969 births
American male writers
American male composers
21st-century American composers
American filmmakers
Record producers from New York (state)
Living people
21st-century American male musicians